Hebran (also Romanized as Hebrān and Habaran; also known as Hībrān and Mīānī) is a village in Khoshkrud Rural District, in the Central District of Zarandieh County, Markazi Province, Iran. At the 2006 census, its population was 36, in 13 families.

References 

Populated places in Zarandieh County